{{Drugbox
| Verifiedfields = changed
| Watchedfields = changed
| verifiedrevid = 458460406
| drug_name =
| INN =
| type = 
| image = Ranitidine.svg
| width = 250
| alt =
| image2 = File:Ranitidine-A-3D-balls.png
| width2 =
| alt2 =
| caption =
| JAN = ranitidine hydrochloride

| pronounce = 
| tradename = Zantac, others
| Drugs.com = 
| MedlinePlus = a601106
| licence_CA = 
| licence_EU = 
| DailyMedID = Ranitidine
| licence_US = Ranitidine
| pregnancy_AU = B1
| pregnancy_AU_comment = 
| pregnancy_category =
| routes_of_administration = By mouth, intravenous (IV)
| class = Histamine H2 receptor antagonist, aka H2 blocker
| ATCvet =
| ATC_prefix = A02
| ATC_suffix = BA02
| ATC_supplemental =  (ranitidine bismuth citrate)

| legal_AU = S4
| legal_AU_comment = / S2 (Pharmacy Medicine)
| legal_BR = 
| legal_BR_comment =
| legal_CA = 
| legal_CA_comment =
| legal_DE = 
| legal_DE_comment =
| legal_NZ = 
| legal_NZ_comment =
| legal_UK = POM
| legal_UK_comment = / GSL (General sales list)
| legal_US = Rx-only
| legal_US_comment = / OTC
| legal_EU = Rx-only
| legal_UN = 
| legal_UN_comment =
| legal_status = 

| bioavailability = 50% (by mouth)
| protein_bound = 15%
| metabolism = Liver: FMOs, including FMO3; other enzymes
| metabolites =
| onset = 55–65 minutes (150 mg dose)55–115 minutes (75 mg dose)
| elimination_half-life = 2–3 hours
| duration_of_action =
| excretion = 30–70% kidney

| index2_label = HCl
| CAS_number_Ref = 
| CAS_number = 66357-35-5
| CAS_number2_Ref = 
| CAS_number2 = 66357-59-3
| CAS_supplemental =
| PubChem = 3001055
| PubChem2 = 3033332
| IUPHAR_ligand = 1234
| DrugBank_Ref = 
| DrugBank = DB00863
| DrugBank2_Ref = 
| DrugBank2 = DBSALT000487
| ChemSpiderID_Ref = 
| ChemSpiderID = 4863
| ChemSpiderID2_Ref = 
| ChemSpiderID2 = 43590
| UNII_Ref = 
| UNII = 884KT10YB7
| UNII2_Ref = 
| UNII2 = BK76465IHM
| KEGG_Ref = 
| KEGG = D00422
| KEGG2_Ref = 
| KEGG2 = D00673
| ChEBI_Ref = 
| ChEBI = 8776
| ChEBI2_Ref = 
| ChEBI2 = 8777
| ChEMBL_Ref = 
| ChEMBL = 1790041
| ChEMBL2_Ref = 
| ChEMBL2 = 2110372
| NIAID_ChemDB =
| PDB_ligand =
| synonyms = Dimethyl [(5-{[(2-{[1-(methylamino)-2-nitroethenyl]amino}ethyl)sulfanyl]methyl}furan-2-yl)methyl]amine

| IUPAC_name = N-(2-[(5-[(Dimethylamino)methyl]furan-2-yl)methylthio]ethyl)-''N-methyl-2-nitroethene-1,1-diamine
| C = 13 | H = 22 | N = 4 | O = 3 | S = 1
| SMILES = [O-] [N+]( = O)C = C(NC)NCCSCc1ccc(o1)CN(C)C
| StdInChI_Ref = 
| StdInChI = 1S/C13H22N4O3S/c1-14-13(9-17(18)19)15-6-7-21-10-12-5-4-11(20-12)8-16(2)3/h4-5,9,14-15H,6-8,10H2,1-3H3
| StdInChI_comment =
| StdInChIKey_Ref = 
| StdInChIKey = VMXUWOKSQNHOCA-UHFFFAOYSA-N
| density =
| density_notes =
| melting_point =
| melting_high =
| melting_notes =
| boiling_point =
| boiling_notes =
| solubility =
| sol_units =
| specific_rotation =
}}Ranitidine, sold under the brand name Zantac among others, is a medication used to decrease stomach acid production. It is commonly used in treatment of peptic ulcer disease, gastroesophageal reflux disease, and Zollinger–Ellison syndrome. It can be given by mouth, injection into a muscle, or injection into a vein. In September 2019, the probable carcinogen N-nitrosodimethylamine (NDMA) was discovered in ranitidine products from a number of manufacturers, resulting in recalls.   In April 2020, ranitidine was withdrawn from the United States market and suspended in the European Union and Australia due to these concerns.  In 2022, these concerns were confirmed in a nationwide population study "ranitidine increased the risk of liver", lung, gastric and pancreatic cancer by 22%,17%, 26% and 35%, respectively. It increased overall cancer risk 10%, p < 0.001.

Common side effects include headaches and pain or burning if given by injection. Serious side effects may include cancer, liver problems, a slow heart rate, pneumonia, and the potential of masking stomach cancer. It is also linked to an increased risk of Clostridium difficile colitis. Ranitidine is an H2 histamine receptor antagonist that works by blocking histamine, thus decreasing the amount of acid released by cells of the stomach.

Ranitidine was discovered in England in 1976, and came into commercial use in 1981. It is on the World Health Organization's List of Essential Medicines. It is still available as a generic medication via the internet. It has been withdrawn at regulator request from most markets, including the United States; it has been discontinued globally, according to the NHS. By 2020, it was the 177th most commonly prescribed medication in the United States, with more than 3million prescriptions, vs nearly 19 million 2 years earlier.

Former medical uses
 Relief of heartburn
 Short-term and maintenance therapy of gastric and duodenal ulcers
 With nonsteroidal anti-inflammatory drugs (NSAIDs) to reduce the risk of ulceration Proton-pump inhibitors (PPIs) are more effective for the prevention of NSAID-induced ulcers.
 Pathologic gastrointestinal (GI) hypersecretory conditions such as Zollinger–Ellison syndrome
 Gastroesophageal reflux disease (GORD or GERD)
 Erosive esophagitis
 Part of a multidrug regimen for H. pylori eradication to minimise the risk of duodenal ulcer recurrence
 Recurrent postoperative ulcer
 Upper GI bleeding
 For prevention of acid-aspiration pneumonitis during surgery, it can be administered preoperatively. The drug increases gastric pH, but generally has no effect on gastric volume. In a 2009 meta-analysis comparing the net benefit of PPIs and ranitidine to reduce the risk of aspiration before anaesthesia, ranitidine was found to be more effective than PPIs in reducing the volume of gastric secretions. Ranitidine may have an anti-emetic effect when administered preoperatively.
 Prevention of stress-induced ulcers in critically ill patients
 Used together with diphenhydramine as secondary treatment for anaphylaxis; after first-line epinephrine.

Contraindication
Ranitidine has been discontinued globally, according to the NHS, and is contraindicated due to excess cancer risk and the ready availability of H2 antagonist and PPI alternatives.

Adverse effects
These adverse effects for ranitidine have been reported as events in clinical trials:

Central nervous system
Rare reports have been made of ranitidine causing malaise, dizziness, somnolence, insomnia, and vertigo. In severely ill, elderly patients, cases of reversible mental confusion, agitation, depression, and hallucinations have been reported.

Cardiovascular
Arrhythmias such as tachycardia, bradycardia, atrioventricular block, and premature ventricular beats have also been reported.

Gastrointestinal
All drugs in the H2 receptor blocker class of medicines have the potential to cause vitamin B12 deficiency, secondary to a reduction in food-bound vitamin B12 absorption. Elderly patients taking H2 receptor antagonists are more likely to require B12 supplementation than those not taking such drugs. H2 blockers may also reduce the absorption of drugs (azole antifungals, calcium carbonate) that require an acidic stomach. In addition, multiple studies suggest the use of H2 receptor antagonists such as ranitidine may increase the risk of infectious diarrhoea, including traveller's diarrhoea and salmonellosis. A 2005 study found that by suppressing acid-mediated breakdown of proteins, ranitidine may lead to an elevated risk of developing food or drug allergies, due to undigested proteins then passing into the GI tract, where sensitisation occurs. Patients who take these agents develop higher levels of immunoglobulin E against food, whether they had prior antibodies or not. Even months after discontinuation, an elevated level of IgE in 6% of patients was still found in the study.

Liver
Cholestatic hepatitis, liver failure, hepatitis, and jaundice have been noted, and require immediate discontinuation of the drug. Blood tests can reveal an increase in liver enzymes or eosinophilia, although in rare instances, severe cases of hepatotoxicity may require a liver biopsy.

Lungs
Ranitidine and other histamine H2 receptor antagonists may increase the risk of pneumonia in hospitalised patients. They may also increase the risk of community-acquired pneumonia in adults and children.

Blood
Thrombocytopenia is a rare but known side effect. Drug-induced thrombocytopenia usually takes weeks or months to appear, but may appear within 12 hours of drug intake in a sensitised individual. Typically, the platelet count falls to 80% of normal, and thrombocytopenia may be associated with neutropenia and anemia.

Skin
Rash, including rare cases of erythema multiforme, and rare cases of hair loss and vasculitis have been seen.

Precautions
Disease-related concerns
Relief of symptoms due to the use of ranitidine does not exclude the presence of a gastric malignancy. In addition, with kidney or liver impairment, ranitidine must be used with caution. It should be avoided in patients with porphyria, as it may precipitate an attack.

Children
In children, the use of gastric acid inhibitors has been associated with an increased risk for development of acute gastroenteritis and community-acquired pneumonia. A cohort analysis including over 11,000 neonates reported an association of H2 blocker use, and an increased incidence of necrotizing enterocolitis in very-low-birth-weight (VLBW) neonates. In addition, about a six-fold increase in mortality, necrotizing enterocolitis, and infection such as sepsis, pneumonia, urinary tract infection was reported in patients receiving ranitidine in a cohort analysis of 274 VLBW neonates.

Drug tests
Ranitidine may return a false positive result with some commercial urine drug screening kits for testing for drugs of abuse.

Cancer-causing impurities

In September 2019, the U.S. Food and Drug Administration (FDA) learned that some ranitidine medicines, including some products sold under the brand name Zantac, contained a nitrosamine impurity called N-nitrosodimethylamine (NDMA), classified as a probable human carcinogen, at low levels. Health Canada announced that it was assessing NDMA in ranitidine and requested that manufacturers stop the distribution of ranitidine products in Canada until the NDMA levels in the products are found to be safe. Health Canada announced that ranitidine drugs were being recalled by Sandoz Canada, Apotex Inc., Pro Doc Limitée, Sanis Health Inc., and Sivem Pharmaceuticals ULC. The European Medicines Agency started a European Union-wide review of ranitidine medicines at the request of the European Commission.

In October 2019, the U.S. FDA observed that a third-party laboratory was using higher temperatures in its tests to detect nitrosamine impurities. The NDMA was generated by the added heat, but the higher temperatures are recommended for using a gas chromatography–mass spectrometry method to test for NDMA in valsartan and angiotensin II receptor blockers. The FDA stated that it recommends using a liquid chromatography-high resolution mass spectrometry (LC-HRMS) testing protocol to test samples of ranitidine. Its LC-HRMS testing method does not use elevated temperatures, and has shown the presence of much lower levels of NDMA in ranitidine medicines than were reported by the third-party laboratory. International regulators using similar LC-MS testing methods have also shown the presence of low levels of NDMA in ranitidine samples. The FDA provided additional guidance about using another LC-MS method based on a triple-quadrupole MS platform. 

In September 2019, Sandoz issued a "precautionary distribution stop" of all medicines containing ranitidine, followed a few days later by a recall of ranitidine hydrochloride capsules in the United States. The Italian Medicines Agency recalled all ranitidine that uses an active pharmaceutical ingredient from Saraca Laboratories. The Federal Union of German Associations of Pharmacists (Arzneimittelkommission der Deutschen Apotheker) published a list of recalled products, as did the Therapeutic Goods Administration in Australia.

In November 2019, the FDA stated that its tests found levels of NDMA in ranitidine and nizatidine that are similar to those that one may typically ingest with common foods such as grilled or smoked meats.  The FDA also stated that its simulated gastric fluid model tests and simulated intestinal fluid model tests indicated that NDMA is not formed when exposed to acid in the stomach with a normal diet. The FDA advised companies to recall their ranitidine if testing shows levels of NDMA above the acceptable daily intake (96 nanograms per day or 0.32 parts per million for ranitidine). At the same time, it indicated that some levels of NDMA found in medicines still exceeded the agency's acceptable levels.

In December 2019, the FDA asked manufacturers of ranitidine and nizatidine products to expand their NDMA testing to include all lots of the medication before making them available to consumers.

In April 2020, new FDA testing and evaluation prompted by information from third-party laboratories confirmed that NDMA levels increase in ranitidine even under normal storage conditions, and NDMA has been found to increase significantly in samples stored at higher temperatures, including those at which the product may be exposed during distribution and handling by consumers. The testing also showed that the level of NDMA increases as ranitidine medication ages. These conditions may raise the NDMA level above the acceptable daily intake limit.

Some evidence indicates that NDMA may form from the degradation of ranitidine itself with increasing levels seen over its shelf life. Whether NDMA can also be formed from ranitidine inside the body is unclear. Some studies suggest that it can, while others do not. Given the uncertainties, the Committee for Medicinal Products for Human Use (CHMP) of the European Medicines Agency (EMA) recommended a precautionary suspension of these medicines in the EU.

In August 2020, the EMA provided guidance to marketing authorization holders for avoiding the presence of nitrosamine impurities and asked them to review all chemical and biological human medicines for the presence of nitrosamines and to test the products at risk. In September 2020, the FDA issued guidance about the control of nitrosamine impurities in human drugs.  An implementation plan was issued in February 2021.

 List of recalls 
In September 2019, Apotex recalled all over-the-counter ranitidine tablets sold in the United States at Walmart, Rite Aid, and Walgreens. These retailers, along with CVS, removed Zantac and some generics from their shelves.

On 8 October 2019, the Medicines and Healthcare products Regulatory Agency of the United Kingdom (UK) issued a drug alert for ranitidine "... to proactively communicate the recall to hospitals, pharmacies, dispensing practices, retailers and wholesalers in the UK." This included all Zantac-branded preparations, along with all generic preparations of ranitidine from Teva UK Limited, Rosemont Pharmaceuticals Limited, Omega Pharma Limited and Galpharm International Limited, Perrigo Company plc, Creo Pharma Limited and Tillomed Laboratories Limited, OTC Concepts Ltd, Relonchem Ltd, Noumed Life Sciences Ltd, and Medreich Plc., Accord Healthcare, Medley Pharma Limited, and Medreich Plc.

On 15 October 2019, the Department of Health and Social Care of the United Kingdom issued a supply distribution alert (SDA/2019/005) for all oral formulations of ranitidine.

In October 2019, Sanofi recalled all over-the-counter Zantac in the United States and Canada,  Perrigo issued a worldwide recall of ranitidine, Dr. Reddy's issued a recall of all ranitidine products in the United States, and
Novitium Pharma recalled all ranitidine hydrochloride capsules in the U.S.

In November 2019, Aurobindo Pharma, Amneal Pharmaceuticals, American Health Packaging, Golden State Medical Supply, and Precision Dose recalled some lots of ranitidine tablets, capsules, and syrup.  

In December 2019, Glenmark Pharmaceutical Inc., USA, recalled some lots of ranitidine tablets.

In January 2020, Appco Pharma LLC and Northwind Pharmaceuticals recalled some lots of ranitidine tablets and capsules.

In February 2020, American Health Packaging recalled some lots of ranitidine tablets manufactured by Amneal Pharmaceuticals.

In April 2020, the FDA requested a manufacturer's market withdrawal of ranitidine, meaning that ranitidine products would not be available for prescription or over-the-counter sale in the U.S.

In April 2020, the Committee for Medicinal Products for Human Use (CHMP) of the European Medicines Agency recommended the suspension of all ranitidine medicines in the European Union because of the presence of low levels of NDMA. Text was copied from this source which is © European Medicines Agency. Reproduction is authorized provided the source is acknowledged. In June 2020, a ranitidine manufacturer requested a re-examination of the CHMP's April 2020 opinion.

In December 2020, the EMA confirmed its recommendation to suspend all ranitidine medicines in the European Union. The UK National Health Service (NHS) Web site  said "Ranitidine is not currently available in the UK or globally... It's not yet known whether it will be available again in future".

On 1 July 2021 Solara Active Pharma Sciences, which supplies ranitidine active pharmaceutical ingredient (API), said that it had mitigated the risks of the formation of NDMA during the manufacturing of ranitidine API. The company was granted a revised certificate by the European Directorate for the Quality of Medicines and Healthcare, which proves that the API complies with European rules. in October 2021 Accord Healthcare was considering the possible reintroduction of ranitidine, but GlaxoSmithKline, Sanofi, and Teva said they had no plans to reintroduce the drug.

Pharmacology

Mechanism of action
Ranitidine is a competitive, reversible inhibitor of the action of histamine at the histamine H2 receptors found in gastric parietal cells. This results in decreased gastric acid secretion and gastric volume, and reduced hydrogen ion concentration.

Pharmacokinetics
Oral absorption: 50%

Protein binding: 15%

Metabolism: N-oxide is the principal metabolite.

Half-life elimination: With normal renal function, ranitidine taken orally has a half-life of 2.5–3.0 hours. If taken intravenously, the half-life is generally 2.0–2.5 hours in a patient with normal creatinine clearance.

Excretion: The primary route of excretion is the urine. In addition, about 30% of the orally administered dose is collected in the urine as unabsorbed drug in 24 hours.

Elderly
In the elderly population, the plasma half-life of ranitidine is prolonged to 3–4 hours secondary to decreased kidney function causing decreased clearance.

Children
In general, studies of pediatric patients (aged one month to 16 years) have shown no significant differences in pharmacokinetic parameter values in comparison to healthy adults, when correction is made for body weight.

History

Ranitidine was first prepared in England as AH19065 by John Bradshaw in the summer of 1977 in the Ware research laboratories of Allen and Hanburys, part of the larger Glaxo organisation. Its development was a response to the first in class histamine H2 receptor antagonist, cimetidine, developed by Sir James Black at Smith, Kline and French, and launched in the United Kingdom as Tagamet''' in November 1976. Both companies eventually merged as GlaxoSmithKline (GSK), following a sequence of mergers and acquisitions, starting with the integration of Allen and Hanbury's Ltd and Glaxo to form Glaxo Group Research in 1979, and ultimately with the merger of Glaxo Wellcome and SmithKline Beecham in 2000. Ranitidine was the result of a rational drug-design process using what was by then a fairly refined model of the histamine H2 receptor and quantitative structure-activity relationships.

Glaxo refined the model further, by replacing the imidazole ring of cimetidine with a furan ring with a nitrogen-containing substituent, and in doing so developed ranitidine. Ranitidine was found to have a far-improved tolerability profile (i.e. fewer adverse drug reactions), longer-lasting action, and 10 times the activity of cimetidine. Ranitidine has 10% of the affinity that cimetidine has to CYP450, so it causes fewer side effects, but other H2 blockers famotidine and nizatidine have no CYP450 significant interactions.

Ranitidine was introduced in 1981, and was the world's biggest-selling prescription drug by 1987. Subsequently, it was largely superseded by the more effective proton-pump inhibitor (PPI) class of drugs, with omeprazole becoming the biggest-selling drug for many years. When omeprazole and ranitidine were compared in a study of 144 people with severe inflammation and erosions or ulcers of the oesophagus, 85% of those treated with omeprazole healed within eight weeks, compared with 50% of those given ranitidine. In addition, the omeprazole group reported earlier relief of heartburn symptoms.

In September 2019, the probable carcinogen N-nitrosodimethylamine (NDMA) was discovered in ranitidine products from a number of manufacturers, resulting in recalls; in April 2020, it was withdrawn from the United States market and suspended in Europe and Australia.

Preparations

Preparations of ranitidine products include oral tablets (75, 150, and 300 mg), effervescent tablets, and syrups, and injectable solutions; with doses of specific ranitidine product preparations are available over-the-counter (OTC) in various countries. In the United Kingdom, only the lowest-strength, 75-mg tablet is available to purchase without a prescription. In Australia, packs containing seven or 14 doses of the 150-mg tablet are available in supermarkets, small packs of 150-mg and 300-mg tablets are schedule 2 pharmacy medicines. Larger doses and pack sizes require a prescription. In the United States, 75- and 150-mg tablets are available OTC. Since 2017, Zantac is marketed in the U.S. by Sanofi. In India, it is sold under the brand name Rantac OD.

References

External links 
 
 
 

CYP3A4 inhibitors
Dimethylamino compounds
Furans
GSK plc brands
H2 receptor antagonists
Hepatotoxins
Nephrotoxins
Nitroethenes
Novartis brands
Thioethers
Withdrawn drugs
World Health Organization essential medicines
Wikipedia medicine articles ready to translate